Hydrocotyle geraniifolia, commonly known as the forest pennywort, is a species of Hydrocotyle found in Australia. The habitat is moist forest floors often on the sides of hills.

References

geraniifolia
Flora of New South Wales
Flora of Queensland
Flora of Victoria (Australia)
Plants described in 1855